Alden and Thomasene Howell House is a historic home located at Waynesville, Haywood County, North Carolina. It was built about 1905, and is a -story, Shingle Style frame dwelling.  It features asymn1etrical massing, a cross gambrel roof, wraparound porch with square stone piers and balustrade, a stone porte-cochère, and a corner turret.

It was listed on the National Register of Historic Places in 2003.

References

Houses on the National Register of Historic Places in North Carolina
Queen Anne architecture in North Carolina
Houses completed in 1905
Houses in Haywood County, North Carolina
National Register of Historic Places in Haywood County, North Carolina
Waynesville, North Carolina
1905 establishments in North Carolina